The methods, courses and/or techniques of the organizations listed here have been identified with Large-group awareness training by reliable sources.

A
 Actualizations (Stewart Emery)
 Alpha Seminars
 Arica School (Oscar Ichazo)
 Atlas Project
 Avatar Course (Harry Palmer)
 AsiaWorks
 Ascension Leadership Academy

B

C
 Call of the Shofar (founded by Simcha Frischling)
 Context International (previously Context Associated, founded by Randy Revell, who had worked with Mind Dynamics)
 Contextuelles Coaching (Maria & Stephan Craemer) 
 Choices Personal Growth Seminar

D
 Dimensional Mind Approach
 Direct Centering (Gavin Barnes, aka Bayard Hora Associates, aka The Course, aka Naexus)

E
 Erhard Seminars Training (est) (Werner Erhard)
 Exegesis

F

 The Forum (Werner Erhard)

G

H
Heartcore Leadership

I
 Impact Training (Hans & Sally Berger)

 Insight Seminars (John-Roger Hinkins) (Russell Bishop)

 Inner Matrix Systems (Joey Klein)

K

L
 Landmark Worldwide (formerly Landmark Education)
Leadership Dynamics (William Penn Patrick)
Life Dynamics
 Lifespring (John Hanley)
 Lifestream Seminars (James Roswell Quinn)
 Life Training / Kairos Foundation / More to Life (W. R. Whitten and K. B. Brown)

M

 Mind Dynamics (Alexander Everett)

N
 NXIVM (Keith Raniere)

O
 ONE (Oury Engolz)

P
 PSI Seminars

Q

R

Relationships

S
 Silva Method (formerly Silva Mind Control) (José Silva)
 Sterling Institute of Relationship (Arthur Kasarjian)
 Source Point Training

T
 Transformation Technologies (Werner Erhard)
 Tony Robbins

U

V

W
 Werner Erhard and Associates (Werner Erhard)

X

Y

Z

References

External links
 Intruding into the Workplace, Margaret Singer, excerpted from Cults in Our Midst, (1995)
List of Training Programs Considered to be LGATs, Polaski, Mary., 2000.

Large Group Awareness Training